This article lists political parties in Dominica.

Dominica has a two-party system, which means that there are two dominant political parties, with extreme difficulty for anybody to achieve electoral success under the banner of any other party.

The parties

Parliamentary parties

Other parties

Defunct parties
Socialist Workers Party (SWP)
Dominica Liberation Movement (DLM)
Dominica Progressive Party (DPP)
Dominica United People's Party (DUPP)
People's Democratic Movement (PDM)

See also

 List of political parties by country

References
 Matthias Catón: "Dominica" in: Elections in the Americas. A Data Handbook, vol. 1, ed. by Dieter Nohlen. Oxford University Press, Oxford, 2005: pp. 223–237 

Dominica
 
Political parties
Political parties
Dominica